Samuel or Sam Cooper may refer to:
Samuel Cooper (painter) (1609–1672), English miniature painter
Samuel Cooper (clergyman) (1725–1783), Congregationalist minister in Boston, Massachusetts
Samuel Cooper (surgeon) (1780–1848), English surgeon and writer of medical books
Samuel Cooper (general) (1798–1876), U.S. Army officer and senior Confederate general officer
Samuel Cooper (serial killer) (born 1977), American serial killer
Samuel B. Cooper (1850–1918), U.S. Representative from Texas
Sam Cooper (baseball) (born 1897), American baseball player
Sam Cooper (American football) (1909–1998), American football player
Sam Cooper, fictional character on television series Criminal Minds: Suspect Behavior

Other uses
Sam Cooper Boulevard, highway in Memphis, Tennessee